Kennie is both a masculine given name and a surname. Notable people with the name include:

Kennie Childers, American NASCAR team owner
Kennie Chopart (born 1990), Danish footballer
Kennie MacAskill (born 1933), Canadian politician
Kennie Steenstra (born 1970), American baseball player and coach
George Kennie (1904–1994), English cricketer

Masculine given names